Kyaa Kahein is a Hindi language supernatural drama series aired on Zoom channel. The series premiered on 17 September 2004. The series was hosted by actor Irrfan Khan.

References

External links
 

Balaji Telefilms television series
2000s Indian television miniseries
Indian horror fiction television series
2004 Indian television series debuts
2006 Indian television series endings
Zoom (Indian TV channel) original programming